The French Art Collection in National Museum of Serbia consists of more than 250 paintings and more than 400 graphics and drawings, from the 16th to early 20th century, including the Šlomović Collection (58 paintings and over 200 graphics). Among the French painters represented in the collection are Robert Tournières, Hubert Robert, Sébastien Bourdon, Eugène Delacroix, Gauguin, Renoir, Henri de Toulouse-Lautrec, Matisse, Monet, Cézanne, Degas, Jean-Baptiste-Camille Corot, Mary Cassatt, Paul Signac, Maurice Utrillo, Auguste Rodin, Georges Rouault, Pierre Bonnard, Pissarro, Odilon Redon, Gustave Moreau, Honoré Daumier, Eugène Carrière, Maurice de Vlaminck, André Derain, Raoul Dufy, Suzanne Valadon, Eugène Fromentin, Émile Bernard, Forain, André Dunoyer de Segonzac, Robert Delaunay, Pascin, Rosa Bonheur, Marie Laurencin, Georges Dufrénoy. The graphic and etching collection includes work by Charles Le Brun, Sébastien Bourdon, Jacques Callot, Charles-François Daubigny, Degas, Delacroix, Jean-Baptiste-Camille Corot, Le Corbusier (3 graphic), Renoir, Jean Cocteau, Eugène Carrière, etc. .

Some of the works are:
Nicolas Tournier, Concert (canvas 120x169cm) (Before attributed to Caravaggio)
Robert Tournières, Regent and Ms De Parabere (canvas 96x130cm)
Jean-Marc Nattier, Portrait of Lady with Flower (canvas 73x59cm)
Hubert Robert, (2 works) Stairway of Farnese Palace Park and Park on the Lake
Felix Nadar, Milos Obrenovic Portrait (canvas 116x90cm 1874)
Cézanne,(5 works) Breakfast in the field (4 works)-(lithograph) Bathers (watercolor), 
Renoir, (18 paintings, 5 pastels, 25 drawings, 28 prints) canvases: Nude, Sea by Trelaulle, Female Laying Act,  Girl with umbrella, Landscape with post office at Cagnes, Small boy, Two girls, Recumbent Nude, Guitar Players (drawings), Two Women with Umbrellas (1879, Pastel on paper), Bathers (drawing), At the Moulin de la Galette (pencil) and others
Monet, Rouen Cathedral 
Henri de Toulouse-Lautrec, (3 works) Female portrait (canvas), Yvette Gilber Portrait (chalk drawing), Female Singer (lithograph)
Degas (40 works), Three Ballerinas in blue, Courtesans, Ballerinas (drawing), Women at her Toilet (drawing), Monotype, The bath, Bust of man in soft hat, Study of a Dancer in Tights (1900, black crayon) and others
Gauguin, (5 works) Tahitian girl (oil on canvas - 143 x 98 cm), Tahitian Girl with Dog (watercolor), Still Life with Liqueur bottle Benedikt (oil on canvas), Joys of Brittany (1889, tempera), Tahitian Man with the Craft (watercolour)
Pissarro, (2 canvases, 2 watercolours, 6 graphics) Place du Theatre Francais-Sun effect (canvas), Green Landscape (canvas), Portrait of Paul Gauguin (watercolor), Road through Field (watercolor)  and  Market at Pontoise (drawing)
Matisse, (3 works) Red Beech (canvas), Head of a Woman (drawing), Beside the window (canvas)
Corot (4 canvases, 1 drawing), In the Park (canvas), Landscape from Italy (canvas), Pasture beside the Hillock (canvas),Landscape with the Swamp and Meadow by the Swamp (drawing)
André Derain, (3 oils, 2 chalks), Sailboats at Carriéres, Landscape with Olive Trees, Still Life, Female Act (chalk), Nude (chalk).
Honoré Daumier, Mother
Gustave Moreau, Tired Centaur
Maurice Utrillo, (5 oils and 1 gouache) Cabare Lapine Agile II, Montmartre, Montmartre under snow (gouache), Parisian Street, Cathedral in Sartre (canvas), Madhouse in Sanoa and Saint-Vensain Street
Maurice de Vlaminck, (5 works) Fields,  The snow, Vase with Flowers, Still Life with Fish (1905) and My Father's Orchard (1905)
Redon, (11 works) A Head of a Gnome, Profile of a Girl with Flowers, La Chimere (drawing) and Eyes (drawing)
Paul Signac, (2 works) Woman drinking tea (canvas), St. Malo, Walls and Barges (aquarelle)
Pierre Bonnard, (3 canvases, 25 graphics and 1 pastel) Reading Lady (canvas), Sitting Child (canvas),City scene on Mon-Matre, Still Life, Place Clichy (pastel)
Auguste Rodin, (1 watercolor, 2 graphics), Female Act (watercolor),Female Act (pencil) and Two Females Act (pencil)
Édouard Vuillard, Interior (tempera), Child on Sleeping (pastel)
Raoul Dufy, (2 gouaches and 29 etchings) St Juan Bay (aquarelle)
Constant Troyon, Cows and Sheep
Rosa Bonheur, White Horse in the Stalls
Othon Friesz, Woman with Jar  and  Flowers
Marie Laurencin, Two sisters (canvas) and Ballerinas (lithography)
Georges Rouault, (1 watercolour, 1 gouache, 52 etchings and graphics) Old man Ibi (gouache and tempera), Clown (aquarelle)
Léopold Survage, Landscape from Colliure (tempera)
Charles-François Daubigny, Landscape with Moonshine (canvas)
Henri Harpignies, Landscape with River (canvas 123x150cm), Omans by Erissone, Landscape (aquarelle)
Jean Cocteau, Sketch (drawing)
Eugène Boudin, Still Life with Cherries
Suzanne Valadon, Flowers, Still Life with Flowers
Félix Ziem, Venetian Landscape with Sailing Boat
André Lhote, (1 canvas,3 graphics) Female Portrait c1925,
Lucien Pissarro, Sunny Landscape (canvas), Rain in Cold Harbour (canvas)
Forain, (1 pastel, 24 graphics), Satirical Scenes, Ballerina (pastel)
Jacques-Émile Blanche, Princess Olga of Greece and Denmark Portrait
Georges Dufrénoy, Still Life with Flowers, Dahlias
Léon-Victor Dupré, Forest
Aristide Maillol, (3 sculptures and 3 charcoals) The Bather, The Bather with Veil and Sketch Composition
Louis Gustave Ricard, Portrait of Man in Black Coat
Bernard, Pere Ubu
Robert Delaunay, Runners, Eiffel Tower (ink)
Pascin, Balcony
Rodolphe d'Erlanger, Balcony in Flowers
Léon Augustin Lhermitte, Haystacks
Paul Dubois, Moroccan Fortune-Teller
André Dunoyer de Segonzac, Landscape from South (canvas), Nude Woman (ink)
Charles Fouqueray, Mount Adam in Sri Lanka
Eugène Isabey, Gothic Ruins
Georges Scott, Bridge (canvas)
Eugène Carrière, Mother with her Child (canvas), Landscape with Figure, Landscape with Hill
Alfred Manessier, Tree (lithograph)
Maurice Denis, Girl with Basket (charcoal)
Lucien-Victor Guirand de Scévola, Road to Provence (canvas 147x115cm)

References

External links

Virtual Gallery of National Museum of Serbia

Collections of the National Museum of Serbia
National Museum of Serbia
National Museum of Serbia
National Museum of Serbia
Art works in the National Museum of Serbia
Serbia-related lists